Zaza is a French-language play written by playwrights Pierre Berton and , and staged for the first time at the Théâtre du Vaudeville in Paris, in May 1898. The title character is a prostitute who becomes a music hall entertainer and the mistress of a married man.

The play is probably best known in the English-speaking world in the adaptation of the same title by David Belasco, which premiered at the Lafayette Square Opera House in Washington, D.C., in December 1898, and subsequently opened at the Garrick Theatre in New York City, in January 1899.  It is also the source material for the 1900 opera Zazà by Ruggero Leoncavallo.

A substantial difference between the two stagings is that in the original French play, Zaza and her married customer resume their relationship after she becomes a successful performer, whereas in the American adaptation, they do not reunite.

Films
 (France, 1913, dir. , with Maria Ventura
Zaza (1915, dir. Edwin S. Porter and Hugh Ford), with Pauline Frederick
Zaza (1923, dir. Allan Dwan), with Gloria Swanson
Zaza (1939, dir. George Cukor), with Claudette Colbert
 (Italy, 1944, dir. Renato Castellani), with Isa Miranda
 (France, 1956, dir. René Gaveau), with

References

External links

Plays by David Belasco
1898 plays
Plays based on other plays
French plays adapted into films